Chi Ta-wei (born February 3 1972) is a Taiwanese writer.

Life
Chi Ta-wei was born in Taichung, Taiwan in 1972. He attended National Taiwan University, graduating from the Department of Foreign Language and Literature, and received a degree in Comparative Literature from the University of California, Los Angeles. He teaches literature at National Cheng Kung University in Tainan.

Career
Chi Ta-wei is most well-known for his science fiction novel Membrane (1996), which was one of the first queer novels to be published in Chinese.

He has also published various short story collections and volumes of critical essays on queer and science-fiction literature, and translated several foreign works into Chinese, including a series of novels by Italian author Italo Calvino.

Works

Works in Chinese (partial)
 Sensory World (1995)
 Membrane (1996)
 Queer Carnival (1997)
 Goodnight, Babylon: Sexuality, Dissent, and Political Reading for the Internet Generation (1998)
 Fetishism (1998)
 A History of Tongzhi Literature: The Invention of Taiwan (2017)

Works in translation
 "A Stranger's ID" in Angelwings: Contemporary Queer Fiction from Taiwan (2003), translated by Fran Martin
 Membrane (2015), translated by Gwennaël Gaffric
 Perles (2020), translated by Olivier Bialais, Gwennaël Gaffric, Coraline Jortay, and Pierrick Rivet
 The Membranes (2021), translated by Ari Larissa Heinrich

References

External links 
 "A Stranger's ID" in Asymptote

1972 births

Living people
Taiwanese LGBT writers
LGBT culture in Taiwan
National Taiwan University alumni
University of California, Los Angeles alumni
People from Taichung
Writers from Taichung
20th-century Taiwanese writers
21st-century Taiwanese writers
Taiwanese novelists